Sokograd, sometimes Sokol-grad, Soko-grad, Soko or Sokol, is a medieval fortress with a castle town in the Pliva river valley, between Gerzovo and nearby Šipovo, in Šipovo municipality, Republika Srpska entity of Bosnia and Herzegovina. It was a center of the župa Pliva (at the time also called Pljeva) during the time of Medieval Bosnia. It was built in a canyon on a steep slope high above the river Sokočnica, which flows into Pliva in Šipovo.

Etymology 
Sokograd or Sokol derives from the Slavic word falcon (Sokol) and thus being a castle with castle town, it received the grad suffix.

Geography 
Sokograd was a medieval castle and a castle town in the Pliva valley, within the settlement of Gerzovo, municipality of Mrkonjić Grad, at the border of municipality of Šipovo.

History 
Sokograd was probably built at the end of the first half of the 13th century when the first stronger fortresses began to be built in the then Banate of Bosnia. During his attack on Bosnia, King Lajos I of Anjou tried to capture it in July 1363 but was prevented from doing so by the heroic defense of the city and they withdrew after three days of fighting. At the head of the defense was Knyaz Vukac Hrvatinić, father of more prominent Grand Duke of Bosnia, Hrvoje Vukčić Hrvatinić. Knyaz Vukac, on these merits, received the Sokograd with entire župa of Pliva from Ban Tvrtko, and was bestowed with a title of duke. The Hungarians tried again to capture the city in 1405 but were defeated again. The King of Bosnia, Stephen Tomašević, spent a short time in the fortress during the period in which the Kingdom of Bosnia collapsed under the Ottoman invasion, after which it was recaptured by the Kingdom of Hungary. During the battles between the Ottomans and the Hungarians in the second half of the 15th and the beginning of the 16th century, Sokograd was part of the Hungarian Jajce Banovina up until 1518-1521. The Ottomans finally occupied it in 1518,  or in 1521. During the 16th century, it was mentioned as one of the 9 Vlach principalities of Bosnia. Sokograd served the Ottoman Empire until 1833 when it was abandoned by Ottoman Garrisons. The Fortress along with the rest of Bosnia was incorporated into the Austro-Hungarian Empire in 1878.

In an Ottoman defter there were 207 Christian households with 222 tabis along with 79 Muslim households along 90 tabis.

Creation 

In the beginning, Sokograd consisted only of the so-called fortified tower (A) with a small courtyard. The city was later expanded to today's Upper Town, to which the Lower Town was later added, after which the ramparts and towers were strengthened and adapted to the use of firearms. One of the last stages in the development of the fort was the construction of a tower on the other side of the Sokocnica canyon , which protected Sokograd from artillery attacks in the west. On the ramparts of the fort can be seen three layers of construction and development of the city, which characterize the state in which the fortress was located.

Time periods 
 1. Banovina and Kingdom of Bosnia (from its establishment until 1463 )
 2. Hungary (from 1463 to 1521 )
 3. Ottoman Empire (from 1521 to 1833 )

See also 
 Šipovo
 Gerzovo
 Kingdom of Bosnia

References

Notes

Books

External links 
 "Fortress Sokograd"

National Monuments of Bosnia and Herzegovina
Forts in Bosnia and Herzegovina
Šipovo